The 2009–10 Venezuelan Professional Baseball League season ( or LVBP) was contested in two round robin league phases and a playoff final.

First league phase
This round is called "Ronda Eliminatoria" or  "Regular" by the league.
It was played from 9 October to 26 December.

The first 5 teams advanced to the second league phase.

(*)Zulia and Lara played an extra, tie-breaking game on 26 December 2009 in Maracaibo's "Luis Aparicio El Grande" stadium, with victory for the local Aguilas del Zulia with a 3–2 score.

Second league phase
This round is called "Round Robin" or "Semi-final" by the league.
It was played from 28 December to 19 January.

The top two teams classified to the championship series.

Championship series

Games:

(*) Game decided on extra-innings. Inning 10.

The Leones del Caracas were crowned LVBP 2009-2010 Champions.
In the 2010 Caribbean Series they went 1-5 and finished 4th.

Awards
Most Valuable Player (Víctor Davalillo Award): Ernesto Mejía (Zulia)

Overall Offensive Performer of the year: Tom Evans (Lara)

Rookie of the year: Ernesto Mejía (Zulia)

Comeback of the year:  Tom Evans (Lara)

Manager of the year (Chico Carrasquel Award): Carlos García (Magallanes)

Pitcher of the year (Carrao Bracho Award): Jean Machi (Magallanes)

Closer of the year: Jean Machi (Magallanes)

Setup of the year: Elio Serrano (La Guaira)

70th LVBP Anniversary (Alejandro Carrasquel Trophy): Orber Moreno (Caracas)

Highlights
Leones del Caracas won their 17th championship, and their first final against Navegantes del Magallanes.

External links
Official League Website

LVBP seasons
Venezuelan Professional Baseball League season
Venezuelan Professional Baseball League season